Zoila Barros Fernández  (born 6 August 1979) is a retired Cuban female volleyball player, who played as a middle blocker. She was part of the Cuba women's national volleyball team On club level she played with Ciudad Deportiva La Habana.

Career
She played for the Italian club Medinex Reggio di Calabria for the 1998/99 season. She played with the Russian club Uralochka-NTMK for the 2004/05 season.

Barros was named Best Spiker at the 2005 Women's NORCECA Volleyball Championship in Port of Spain, where Cuba was defeated in the final by title defender USA.

Clubs
  Ciudad Deportiva La Habana (1998)
  Medinex Reggio di Calabria (1998-1999)
  Ciudad Deportiva La Habana (1999-2004)
  Uralochka-NTMK (2004–2005)
  Dinamo Moscow (2005–2006)
  Ciudad Deportiva La Habana (2002)

Awards

Individuals
 2001 FIVB World Grand Prix "Best Server"
 2003 Pan-American Cup "Best Server"
 2003 FIVB World Cup "Best Server"
 2003 NORCECA Championship "Best Server"
 2004 Pan-American Cup "Most Valuable Player"
 2004 Pan-American Cup "Best Server"
 2004 Olympic Games "Best Server"
 2005 NORCECA Championship "Best Spiker"

References

External links
 
 FIVB Profile

1976 births
Living people
Cuban women's volleyball players
Volleyball players at the 2000 Summer Olympics
Volleyball players at the 2004 Summer Olympics
Volleyball players at the 2008 Summer Olympics
Olympic gold medalists for Cuba
Olympic bronze medalists for Cuba
Olympic volleyball players of Cuba
Olympic medalists in volleyball
Medalists at the 2004 Summer Olympics
Volleyball players at the 2003 Pan American Games
Volleyball players at the 2007 Pan American Games
Pan American Games silver medalists for Cuba
Pan American Games gold medalists for Cuba
Sportspeople from Havana
Medalists at the 2000 Summer Olympics
Pan American Games medalists in volleyball
Central American and Caribbean Games silver medalists for Cuba
Competitors at the 2006 Central American and Caribbean Games
Middle blockers
Cuban expatriates in Italy
Cuban expatriates in Russia
Expatriate volleyball players in Italy
Expatriate volleyball players in Russia
Central American and Caribbean Games medalists in volleyball
Medalists at the 2003 Pan American Games
Medalists at the 2007 Pan American Games